Michael Bolton's Big, Sexy Valentine's Day Special is a Netflix variety special starring Michael Bolton and created by The Lonely Island. It was released on Netflix on February 7, 2017.

Plot
When Santa's elves make too many toys for Christmas, Michael Bolton must star in a Valentine's Day special to encourage couples to make love and conceive 75,000 babies.

Cast
 Michael Bolton as himself 
 Sarah Shahi as Carmela
 Adam Scott as himself
 Jimmy Graham as Santa Claus
 Grey Griffin as Announcer
 Brooke Shields as herself
 Janeane Garofalo as herself
 Louie Anderson as himself
 Sinbad as himself
 Andy Richter as himself
 Bob Saget as himself
 Sarah Silverman as Misty
 Randall Park as Blair
 Andy Samberg as Kenny G
 Kenny G as Janitor
 Fred Armisen as Peter Salanz
 Colton Dunn as Chocolatier Customer
 Jorma Taccone as Punk Rocker
 Michael Sheen as Carl Flossy
 Akiva Schaffer as Alan
 Chris Parnell as Dr. Vince Harbert
 Mircea Monroe as Virtual Woman
 Sal Stowers as Virtual Pharmacist
 Maya Rudolph as herself
 Tim Robinson as Chef Roy
 David Theune as Darryl
 Baron Vaughn as Ben
 Maya Erskine as Susan
 Mary Holland as Dianne
 Will Forte as Michael Fulton
 Eric André as Baby Archer
 Luka Jones as Wally
 Casey Wilson as herself
 Scott Aukerman as Security Guard #1
 Nicole Byer as Security Guard #2

Reception
Sophie Gilbert of The Atlantic called Michael Bolton's Big, Sexy Valentine's Day Special "a sparkling and star-studded oddity that’s part-PBS telethon and part-depraved sex comedy...At its best, it’s a glorious, only partly ironic homage to the vocal power and unfettered sexual magnetism of one of the most indelible figures in balladry. At its worst, it’s baffling." Esther Zuckerman of The A.V. Club called the special "a hilarious assault on the very idea of conventional, heteronormative sexiness. It’s ideal Valentine’s Day programming for people who hate the nonsensical commercialism of Valentine’s Day and for anyone who can’t resist unfettered silliness."

References

External links
 
 

English-language television shows
Netflix specials
Valentine's Day television specials
Santa Claus in television
Films directed by Akiva Schaffer
Films directed by Scott Aukerman
2017 television specials